Tabriz Museum of Natural History is a museum of wild life in the city of Tabriz at north western Iran, established in 1993 by Department of Environment of Iran. The museum includes many of taxidermy of wild mammals, reptiles, birds, and aquatics which are inhabiting in Iranian Azerbaijan, Iran, and some other countries. It also have a section for sculptures of dinosaurs.

References

Museums in Tabriz
Museums established in 1993
Natural history museums in Iran